Vădeni is a commune located in Brăila County, Muntenia, Romania. It is composed of three villages: Baldovinești, Pietroiu and Vădeni.

Natives
 Gigi Becali

References

Communes in Brăila County
Localities in Muntenia